Texas Ranger is a 1964 Italian western film directed by Primo Zeglio and scored by Francesco De Masi.

Cast

References

External links
 

1964 Western (genre) films
Spaghetti Western films
Films directed by Primo Zeglio
Films produced by Alberto Grimaldi
Films scored by Francesco De Masi
Shaw Brothers Studio films
Films shot in Rome
Films shot in Madrid
1960s Italian films